George Edward Peter Thorneycroft, Baron Thorneycroft,  (26 July 1909 – 4 June 1994) was a British Conservative Party politician. He served as Chancellor of the Exchequer between 1957 and 1958.

Early life
Born in Dunston, Staffordshire, Thorneycroft was the son of Major George Edward Mervyn Thorneycroft and Dorothy Hope Franklyn. He was the grandson of Sir William Franklyn and nephew of Sir Harold Franklyn. He was educated at Eton and the Royal Military Academy, Woolwich. He was commissioned into the Royal Artillery as a second lieutenant on 29 August 1929 but resigned his commission on 1 July 1931. In 1933, he was called to the bar for the Inner Temple.

Political career
He entered Parliament in the 1938 Stafford by-election, for the borough of Stafford. He was re-commissioned into the Royal Artillery in his previous rank on 30 August 1939. During the Second World War, he served with the Royal Artillery and the general staff. Along with other members of the Tory Reform Committee, Thorneycroft pressed his party to support the Beveridge Report.

He served in the Conservative caretaker Government 1945 as Parliamentary Secretary at the Ministry of War Transport. In the 1945 general election, he lost his seat to his Labour opponent, Stephen Swingler, but he returned in the 1945 Monmouth by-election for Monmouth a few months later.

Throughout the late 1940s Thorneycroft worked assiduously to refurbish the Conservative Party after its disastrous defeat in the 1945 general election. His opposition to the Anglo-American loan in the Commons earned him a reputation as a parliamentary debater, and when the Conservatives returned to power after the general election of 1951, he was appointed President of the Board of Trade. He was instrumental in persuading the government in 1954 to abandon the party's support for protectionism and accept the General Agreement on Tariffs and Trade.

Chancellorship and resignation 
Thorneycroft's support for Harold Macmillan in Macmillan's successful 1957 leadership contest for the premiership led to his appointment as Chancellor of the Exchequer, one of the most senior positions in the government. He resigned in 1958, along with two junior Treasury Ministers, Enoch Powell and Nigel Birch, because of increased government expenditure. Macmillan, himself a former chancellor, made a famous and much-quoted remark that the resignations were merely "little local difficulties". (In reality, Macmillan was deeply concerned about the possible effects of Thorneycroft's resignation.)

In retrospect, Thorneycroft questioned the wisdom of his resignation, saying that "we probably made our stand too early."

Later political career 
Thorneycroft returned to the Cabinet in 1960, when he was appointed Minister of Aviation by Macmillan. In 1962, he was promoted to be Minister of Defence. He retained the post upon Macmillan's replacement by Sir Alec Douglas-Home; then in April 1964 the post was combined with the First Lord of the Admiralty, Secretary of State for War and Secretary of State for Air as the Secretary of State for Defence. At Defence, Thorneycroft played a pivotal role in the Sunda Straits Crisis, first supporting and then opposing the passage of the aircraft carrier HMS Victorious through the Indonesian-claimed Sunda Strait during the height of the Indonesia-Malaysia confrontation in August and September 1964.

After the Government was defeated in 1964, Thorneycroft first served as Shadow Secretary of State for Defence under Alec Douglas-Home, before being made Shadow Home Secretary by Edward Heath the next year. Thorneycroft lost his seat at the 1966 general election, and was raised to the peerage as a life peer as Baron Thorneycroft, of Dunston in the County of Stafford on 4 December 1967.

Later life
Thorneycroft was a strong supporter of Margaret Thatcher's monetarist policies, and she made him Chairman of the Conservative Party in 1975. He held the position until 1981.

He was notable as an amateur watercolourist and held exhibitions. Winston Churchill, when told of Thorneycroft's interest, had said, "Every minister must have his vice. Painting shall be yours".

He was appointed to the Order of the Companions of Honour (CH) in the 1980 New Year Honours. During his time as M.P. for Monmouth, Thorneycroft lived at Machen House, in the hamlet of Lower Machen, to the west of the City of Newport.

Family

His grandfather was the Victorian Colonel Thomas Thorneycroft, a Wolverhampton industrialist, eccentric, landowner and well-known Conservative; he was asked to stand for election by Benjamin Disraeli. Colonel Thorneycroft owned or leased various houses in Staffordshire and Shropshire including Tettenhall Towers and Tong Castle.

His great-grandfather was George Benjamin Thorneycroft, an ironfounder, JP, Deputy Lord Lieutenant of Staffordshire and first Mayor of Wolverhampton. His grandfather's cousin was John Isaac Thorneycroft who founded Vosper Thorneycroft. A second cousin was Siegfried Sassoon. A third cousin was William Whitelaw. Another second cousin was the novelist Ellen Thorneycroft Fowler. His great uncle was Lord Wolverhampton.

After his first marriage, to Sheila Wells Page, and divorce, he married Carla, Contessa Roberti (later known as Lady Thorneycroft, DBE) in 1949. He had a son by his first wife and a daughter by his second wife.

References

Further reading

 Dell, Edmund. The Chancellors: A History of the Chancellors of the Exchequer, 1945-90 (HarperCollins, 1997) pp 223–41, covers his term as Chancellor.

 The Times, 6 June 1994 (obit)
 The Daily Telegraph, 6 June 1994 (obit)

External links
 
 Brief biography and list of Thorneycroft documents held at Southampton University
 Review of Peter Thorneycroft biography by Stanley Crooks at Southampton University, October 2007
Publisher's blurb for the Crooks biography of Thorneycroft
Two portraits of Peter Thorneycroft at the National Portrait Gallery, one being a photograph by Cecil Beaton

|-

|-

|-

|-

|-

|-

|-

|-

1909 births
1994 deaths
Chairmen of the Conservative Party (UK)
Chancellors of the Exchequer of the United Kingdom
Conservative Party (UK) life peers
Members of the Order of the Companions of Honour
Conservative Party (UK) MPs for English constituencies
Conservative Party (UK) MPs for Welsh constituencies
Members of the Privy Council of the United Kingdom
People educated at Eton College
Secretaries of State for Defence (UK)
UK MPs 1935–1945
UK MPs 1945–1950
UK MPs 1950–1951
UK MPs 1951–1955
UK MPs 1955–1959
UK MPs 1959–1964
UK MPs 1964–1966
UK MPs who were granted peerages
Life peers created by Elizabeth II
Graduates of the Royal Military Academy, Woolwich
British barristers
Presidents of the Board of Trade
Members of the Parliament of the United Kingdom for Stafford
Ministers in the Churchill caretaker government, 1945
Ministers in the Eden government, 1955–1957
Ministers in the Macmillan and Douglas-Home governments, 1957–1964
British Army personnel of World War II
Royal Artillery officers